Ronny Vanmarcke (born 2 October 1947) is a former Belgian cyclist. He competed in the team pursuit at the 1968 Summer Olympics. He also rode in the 1974 Tour de France.

References

External links
 

1947 births
Living people
Belgian male cyclists
Olympic cyclists of Belgium
Cyclists at the 1968 Summer Olympics
Cyclists from West Flanders
People from Lendelede